Holm  is a surname which originated in Scandinavia and Britain. Holm is derived from the Old Norse word holmr meaning a small island.

Geographical distribution 
As of 2014, 24.7% of all known bearers of the surname Holm were residents of the United States (frequency 1:19,643), 21.0% of Denmark (1:360), 19.7% of Sweden (1:671), 10.0% of Norway (1:691), 6.5% of Germany (1:16,505), 4.0% of Finland (1:1,837), 3.8% of Ghana (1:9,477), 2.4% of Canada (1:20,196), 1.3% of Australia (1:24,284) and 1.2% of South Africa (1:58,477).

In Denmark, the frequency of the surname was higher than national average (1:360) in the following regions:
 1. Capital Region of Denmark (1:321)
 2. Region of Southern Denmark (1:333)

In Sweden, the frequency of the surname was higher than national average (1:671) in the following counties:
 1. Örebro County (1:443)
 2. Gävleborg County (1:445)
 3. Västmanland County (1:496)
 4. Kalmar County (1:515)
 5. Dalarna County (1:559)
 6. Jönköping County (1:606)
 7. Östergötland County (1:613)
 8. Uppsala County (1:618)
 9. Södermanland County (1:649)

In Norway, the frequency of the surname was higher than national average (1:691) in the following regions:
 1. Trøndelag (1:559)
 2. Eastern Norway (1:559)

In Finland, the frequency of the surname was higher than national average (1:1,837) in the following regions:
 1. Ostrobothnia (1:263)
 2. Central Ostrobothnia (1:836)
 3. Åland (1:950)
 4. Central Finland (1:1,125)
 5. Uusimaa (1:1,444)
 6. Southwest Finland (1:1,649)

People 
 Anders Holm, American comedy writer
 Andreas Holm (politician) (1906–2003), Norwegian politician for the Centre Party
 Andrew Holm (fl. 1882–1883), Scottish international football player
 Anne Holm (1922–1998), Danish journalist and children's writer  
 Asbjørn Holm (1921–2001), Norwegian politician for the Socialist People's Party 
 Askil Holm, Norwegian singer and musician 
 Astrid Holm (1893-1961), Danish actress
 Astrid Valborg Holm (1876–1937), Danish painter
 Bill Holm (poet) (1943–2009), American poet, essayist, memoirist, and musician  
 Bill Holm (art historian), American artist, author and art historian 
 Billy Holm  (1912–1977), American Major League Baseball catcher
 Børge Holm  (1910–1971), Danish boxer who competed in the 1936 Summer Olympics
 Brian Holm, retired Danish professional rider in road bicycle racing 
 Celeste Holm, American stage, film, and television actress 
 Christian Holm (Scouting)
 Chr. L. Holm (1892–1981), Norwegian politician for the Conservative Party  
 Claus Holm (1918–1996) German film actor
 Christian Holm (Norwegian politician) (1783–1855), Norwegian politician 
 Christian Holm (Swedish politician), Swedish politician of the Moderate Party  
 Christian Hintze Holm Norwegian politician for the Socialist Left Party  
 D. K. Holm, movie reviewer, Internet columnist, radio broadcaster, and author  
 Dallas Holm, singer-songwriter of Christian music, 
 Daniel Fredheim Holm,  Norwegian striker in the football club Aalborg
 Dick Holm, American CIA Operations Officer
 Dorthe Holm, Danish curler 
 Einar Knut Holm, Norwegian politician for the Liberal Party  
 Eleanor Holm  (1913–2004), American swimmer 
 Elmer Holm, American  football coach at Washburn University in Topeka, Kansas 
 Emil Holm (sport shooter) (1877–1968), Finnish sport shooter
 Emil Holm (footballer) (born 2000), Swedish footballer
 Erlend Holm, Norwegian football defender 
 Espen Beranek Holm, Norwegian pop artist and comedian
 Fred Lonberg-Holm, American cello player  
 Georg Hólm, bassist of the Icelandic post-rock band Sigur Rós  
 Gustav Frederik Holm (1849–1940), Danish naval officer and Arctic explorer
 Hanya Holm  (1893–1992), German-born dancer, choreographer, and dance educator
 Harry Holm (1902–1987), Danish gymnast who competed in the 1920 Summer Olympics 
 Håvard Holm, Norwegian civil servant 
Henrik Holm (actor), Norwegian actor and model
 Henrik Holm,  Swedish former tennis player 
 Holly Holm, former UFC bantamweight champion, kickboxer and retired welterweight boxing champion
 Ian Holm (1931–2020), English actor known for his stage work and for many film roles
Janet Holm (1923 – 2018), New Zealand environmental activist and historian
 Jeanne M. Holm (NASA), American scientist and Chief Knowledge Architect at Jet Propulsion Laboratory 
 Jeanne M. Holm, United States Air Force Major General and Women's rights activist. 
 Jens Holm, Swedish Member of the European Parliament for the Left Party 
 Jim Holm (born 1945), American politician
 John Cecil Holm, (1904–1981) American dramatist 
 John Holm, Canadian politician 
 John A. Holm, linguist
 John Holms (1830–1891), Scottish businessman and Liberal politician 
 Kai Holm (1896–1985), Danish film actor
 Karl Eric Holm (1919–2016), Swedish Army lieutenant general
 Knud Holm (1887–1972), Danish gymnast who competed in the 1906 Summer Olympics and 1908 Summer Olympics
 Kris Holm, Canadian best known for riding a unicycle in off-road conditions
 Lasse Holm, Swedish composer, lyricist and singer 
 Leif-Erik Holm (born 1970), German politician
 Ludvig Holm (1858–1928), Danish violinist and composer 
 Martin Holm (1976–2009), Swedish Muay Thai kickboxer and former WMC Muay Thai World Champion
 Michael Holm, German singer, musician, songwriter and producer 
 Mike Holm (1876–1952), Swedish-born American politician 
 Ove Holm
 Peter Holm, Swedish playboy and pop singer
 Peter R. Holm Norwegian poet, author and translator
 Richard H. Holm, American inorganic chemist  
 Richard Holm (tenor), (1912–1988),  German operatic tenor  
 Dick Holm, American CIA Operations Officer 
 Sejer Holm (born 1939), Danish chess player
 Skip Holm, American military pilot during the Vietnam War  
 Soren Holm, prominent bioethicist and philosopher of medicine
 Staffan Valdemar Holm, Swedish theatre director 
 Stefan Holm, Swedish high jumper 
 Steve Holm, American Major League Baseball catcher 
 Sverre Holm (1931–2005), Norwegian stage and film actor 
 Theo Holm  (1854–1932), Danish-American systematic botanist  
 Thomas Holm, Norwegian football player
 Tony Holm, American professional football player 
 Tore Holm (1896–1977), Swedish sailor who competed in the 1920, 1928, 1932, 1936 and in the 1948 Summer Olympics. 
 Ulf Holm, Swedish Green Party politician, member of the Riksdag 
 Valsø Holm (1906–1987), Danish film actor 
 Vilhelm Christian Holm  (1820–1886), Danish composer
 Virginia Paul Holm, American politician  
 Wattie Holm (1901–1950), American Major League Baseball player 
 Yngve Holm (1895–1943), Swedish sailor who competed in the 1920 Summer Olympics

See also 
 Holmes (surname)

References 

Danish-language surnames
Norwegian-language surnames
Swedish-language surnames